Gonanticlea is a genus of moths in the family Geometridae first described by Swinhoe in 1892.

Description
Palpi having second joint reaching well beyond the frontal tuft, where the third joint prominent. Antennae of male ciliated. Forewings with slightly dentate outer margin below apex and angled at vein 4. Hindwings with slightly angled outer margin at vein 4. Vein 5 from below middle of discocellulars, which are angled.

Selected species
Gonanticlea occlusata (Felder, 1875)
Gonanticlea ochreivittata (Bastelberger, 1909)

References

Larentiinae